San Jose and Farallones station is a light rail stop on the Muni Metro M Ocean View line, located in the Ingleside neighborhood of San Francisco, California. The station opened with the extension of the line to Balboa Park station on August 30, 1980. The station has two side platforms in the middle of San Jose Avenue (traffic islands) where passengers board or depart from trains. The stop is not accessible to people with disabilities.

The stop is also served by the  route which provides service along the M Ocean View line during the early morning when trains do not operate.

References

External links 
SFMTA – San Jose Ave and Farallones St inbound and outbound
SFBay Transit (unofficial) – San Jose Ave & Farallones St

Muni Metro stations
Railway stations in the United States opened in 1980
1980 establishments in California